Cabin Branch is a  long 1st order tributary to Brown Creek in Anson County, North Carolina.

Course
Cabin Branch rises in a pond at Sugar Town, North Carolina.  Cabin Branch then flows easterly to meet Brown Creek about 4 miles southwest of Ansonville, North Carolina.

Watershed
Cabin Branch drains  of area, receives about 47.9 in/year of precipitation, has a topographic wetness index of 419.27 and is about 30% forested.

References

Rivers of North Carolina
Rivers of Anson County, North Carolina
Tributaries of the Pee Dee River